Walter Beasley is an American saxophonist, a professor of music at the Berklee College of Music, and founder of Affable Publishing and Affable Records.

Biography
Beasley grew up in El Centro, California. By the age of 13 he was singing in Spanish in a band called Los Elegantes, and he played in various bands and performed at clubs throughout middle and high school.

Beasley graduated from Berklee in 1984, and a year later took a short-term teaching position at the same school, which became a permanent career. He is now a professor at the school.

In 1987, he released his first, self-titled, album, and since 1998 has been one of the top ten best-selling African American saxophonists in the world. Having grown up as a fan of R&B and funk and trained in classical and jazz saxophone, his own style falls between contemporary R&B and contemporary jazz, a blend which has been called "smooth jazz".

He is not only an alto and soprano saxophonist and a singer, but also a composer and producer. He is the founder and CEO of Affable Publishing, and the owner of Affable Records.

Discography

DVDs

Educational
 Sound Production for the Saxophone (Affable Publishing, 2003)
 Hip-Hop Improvisation (Affable Publishing, 2003)
 Circular Breathing with Walter Beasley
 14 Steps to Maximizing Your Performance (for Saxophonists)
 Walter Beasley's Performance Workshop
 Walter Beasley presents Vocal Performance
 Improv Using Pentatonics
 Performance Insight
 Playing Blues
 Resolution Warm-Up
 Using Vibrato
 Improvisations and Delivery Clinic

Live
 Live at Scullers (Affable Records, 2003)
 Live in the Club (Walter Beasley, 2013)

Books
 Performance Insight for Musicians

APPs
 Walter Beasley Smooth Jazz Alarm App
 Walter Beasley in Concert Transcriptions
 Music Lessons by Walter Beasley
 Hip hop Improvisation
 Walter Beasley Transcriptions
 Circular Breathing
 Sound Production for Saxophone
 Sax Meditations

Awards and accolades
 2001 Boston Music Awards, Outstanding Jazz Artist
 2001 Berklee College of Music Trustee Award for advancing the mission and values of the college
 2001 South Middlesex Men's Club Leadership Award for community service and support of youth development in music.
 2001 SESAC National Performing Activity Award for the song "Comin' at Cha"
 2002 SESAC National Performing Activity Award for the song "Rendezvous"
 2003 Boston Music Awards, Jazz Album of the Year (Go With the Flow)
 2013 Forever Ink Achievement Award

References

External links
 Official site
 Faculty biography

1961 births
Living people
Berklee College of Music faculty
Smooth jazz saxophonists
American male saxophonists
21st-century American saxophonists
21st-century American male musicians
American male jazz musicians